Majed Abo Malihah (Arabic:ماجد أبو مليحة; born 1 July 1984) is a Saudi football player who currently plays for Ras Tanura as a goalkeeper for Al-Omran.

External links
 

1984 births
Living people
Saudi Arabian footballers
Ohod Club players
Al-Orobah FC players
Najran SC players
Al-Jabalain FC players
Al-Nojoom FC players
Al-Ain FC (Saudi Arabia) players
Bisha FC players
Al-Badaya Club players
Qilwah FC players
Al-Rawdhah Club players
Al Omran Club players
Al-Suqoor FC players
Ras Tanura SC players
Saudi First Division League players
Saudi Professional League players
Saudi Second Division players
Saudi Fourth Division players
Saudi Third Division players
Association football goalkeepers